Virage Logic corporation, founded 1996, was an American provider of both functional and physical semiconductor intellectual property (IP) for the design of complex integrated circuits. The company's differentiated product portfolio included processor centric solutions, interface IP solutions, embedded SRAMs and NVMs, embedded memory test and repair, logic libraries, and memory development software.

History 

 1996 Company founded.
 1999 India and Armenia R&D operations established.
 2000 Company's initial public offering.
 2001 STAR Memory System introduced.
 2002 Acquisition of InChip, semiconductor logic IP company.
 2007 Acquisition of Ingot Systems, ASIP company.
 2008 Acquisition of Impinj's logic non-volatile memory IP.
 2009 Acquisition of ARC International, configurable processors and multimedia IP company.
 2009 Acquisition of NXP CMOS IP Group.
 2010 Acquired by Synopsys.

Management team 

 Alex Shubat, Chief Executive Officer and Director
 Brani Buric, Executive Vice President of marketing and sales
 Yankin Tanurhan, Vice President and General Manager, NVM Solutions
 Paul Brady, Vice President EMEA

See also 

 ARC International
 Sonic Focus

References

2010 mergers and acquisitions
Fabless semiconductor companies
American companies established in 1996
Electronics companies established in 1996
Computer memory companies
Defunct semiconductor companies of the United States